Bakal is a town in Satkinsky District of Chelyabinsk Oblast, Russia, located on the western slopes of the Ural Mountains on the Chelyabinsk–Ufa railway branch,  west from Chelyabinsk, the administrative center of the oblast. Population:

History

It was founded in 1757 as a settlement of serfs resettled to man new Bakal iron ore mines owned by the association of Ivan and Yakov Tverdyshev and Ivan Myasnikov.

During 1941-1943, a gulag labor camp existed in the area known as Bakal ITL ("Bakal Corrective Labor Camp"), Bakallag (Бакаллаг, abbr. for "Bakal camp") or Bakalstroy of NKVD (Бакалстрой, abbr. for "Bakal construction"), with headquarters in Chelyabinsk. Its main occupations were the construction of a metallurgic, coke, and other plants, logging, and mining. Its peak inmate count was about 4,200. In addition, Bakalstroy was manned by Germans (with the peak count of over 27,000 as of January 1942).

Town status was granted to Bakal on October 25, 1951.

Administrative and municipal status
Within the framework of administrative divisions, it is, together with four rural localities, incorporated within Satkinsky District as the Town of Bakal. As a municipal division, the Town of Bakal is incorporated within Satkinsky Municipal District as Bakalskoye Urban Settlement.

Economy
The town's main enterprise is public company "Bakal Mining Administration" (Bakalskoye rudoupravleniye, commonly referred by its abbreviation "БРУ", BRU). The bureaucratic-style name is inherited from the Soviet times.

References

Notes

Sources

External links
Memorial. Bakal ITL
Official website of Bakal 
Directory of organizations in Bakal 

Cities and towns in Chelyabinsk Oblast
Populated places established in 1757
Geography of Gulag